The 2016–17 Skeleton World Cup was a multi-race series over a season for skeleton. The season started on 2 December 2016 in Whistler, Canada and ended on 17 March 2017 in Pyeongchang, South Korea. The World Cup was organised by the IBSF (formerly the FIBT) who also run World Cups and Championships in skeleton. The season was sponsored by BMW.

Calendar

Results

Men

Women

Standings

Men 

 (*Champion 2016)

Women 

 (*Champion 2016)

References

External links 
 IBSF

Skeleton World Cup
2016 in skeleton
2017 in skeleton
Skeleton